Brendan Grace (1 April 1951 – 11 July 2019) was an Irish comedian and singer. He was best known for his comedy schoolboy character 'Bottler', the 1995 film Moondance, and his 1996 appearance in the Irish TV sitcom Father Ted as Father Fintan Stack. His 1975 song "The Combine Harvester" was a number one hit in Ireland, and his 1982 release of "The Dutchman" is considered to be one of the most enduring versions of the song.

Early life
Born in the heart of Dublin in 1951, Grace was raised on Echlin Street, in the inner city Liberties neighbourhood. His father Seamus worked as a bartender, an ambulance man and other odd jobs to keep the family going. Like many young Dubliners of the time, Grace left school at the age of 13 to begin working. His first job was as a messenger boy, an occupation he often referred to in his live act.

Music career
At the age of 18, Grace formed a band known as the Gingermen. They toured Ireland in what has become known as the showband era of the 1960s, although the Gingermen were a folk group rather than a showband. During a gig one night, the band found themselves two members short; in an attempt to calm an anxious crowd, Grace was thrust upon the stage to humour them. His wit and observations of daily life in Ireland immediately won over the crowd, and he would go on to sell out venues around the globe. He shared stages with many well-known names, such as Frank Sinatra, who referred to Grace as his "man in Europe", and John Denver, among many others.

Grace's hit songs included "Cushie Butterfield", "The Combine Harvester"—which topped the charts in Ireland in 1975, and in 1976 was a UK number one hit for The Wurzels—and "The Dutchman".

Acting career
In 1995, Grace starred in Moondance, and the following year he appeared in the Father Ted episode "New Jack City" as Father Fintan Stack. In 2007, he appeared as Big Sean in Killinaskully, and in 2015, he starred in The Gift.

He also reprised his Bottler character in a TV movie also called Bottler in November 2013. It tells of Bottler's exploits in his early years.

Personal life
Grace married Eileen Doyle in 1973. They had four children, Melanie, Brendan, Amanda, and Bradley. The last is best known as a member of the American metalcore band Poison the Well.

In November 2009, Grace released his autobiography, Amuzing Grace. In his later life, he divided his time between his home in Jupiter, Florida, and his pub in Killaloe, County Clare, which he named Brendan Grace's Bar.

Grace was diagnosed with pneumonia in June 2019, and died from lung cancer at the Galway Clinic in Galway, Ireland, on 11 July 2019, aged 68. His funeral took place on 15 July at the Church of St. Nicholas of Myra in Dublin, followed by cremation. The funeral was attended by thousands of fans who lined the streets outside the church as well as along the procession route, which included stops outside the Guinness brewery and Grace's childhood home on Echlin Street. A year later his family scattered his ashes on Lough Derg near their family home in Killaloe, County Clare. A seat was also dedicated to the entertainer at his favourite spot in Killaloe where he used to feed the ducks and the swans.

References

Further reading

External links

The Combine Harvester (1975) via YouTube

1951 births
2019 deaths
Irish male film actors
Irish male comedians
Irish male television actors
Deaths from lung cancer in the Republic of Ireland
20th-century Irish male actors
21st-century Irish male actors
Irish memoirists
People from The Liberties, Dublin
Comedians from Dublin (city)